Events from the year 1791 in Poland

Incumbents
 Monarch – Stanisław II August

Events

 
 - Constitution of May 3, 1791
 - Friends of the Constitution
 - Guardians of the Laws

Births

Deaths

Religion 
"The dominant national religion is and shall be the sacred Roman Catholic"

Roman catholic

References

 
Years of the 18th century in Poland